Szybowice  (German Schnellewalde) is a village in the administrative district of Gmina Prudnik, within Prudnik County, Opole Voivodeship, in south-western Poland, close to the Czech border.

The village has a population of 1,064.

References

Szybowice